The Best of Buju Banton is a compilation album by dancehall reggae artist Buju Banton, released in 2002 (see 2002 in music).

Track listing
"Champion" [Remix] - 4:31
"Deportees (Things Change)" - 3:55
"Murderer" - 3:56
"Destiny" - 3:59
"Wanna Be Loved" - 4:06
"Untold Stories" - 4:34
"Heartbreak Lover" - 3:24
"Good Body" - 3:53
"Willy (Don't Be Silly)" - 4:55
"Circumstances" - 4:06
"Give I Strength" - 4:01

References

2002 compilation albums
Buju Banton albums